The following pendulum is known as the Mackerras pendulum, invented by psephologist Malcolm Mackerras. Based upon the outcome of the 2007 federal election and changes before the 2010 election, the pendulum works by lining up all of the seats held in Parliament, 83 Labor, 55 Liberal, 9 National, and 3 independent, according to the percentage point margin on a two party preferred basis.

The margins are post-redistribution, leaving some Liberal Party MPs in seats that have a notional majority of Labor Party voters, totalling 88 Labor, 59 coalition, 3 independent. In such cases, the seat is aligned with Labor and the MP's name is highlighted in blue.

The two-party result is also known as the swing required for the seat to change hands. Given a uniform swing to the opposition or government parties in an election, the number of seats that change hands can be predicted. Swing is never uniform, but in practice variations of swing among the Australian states usually tend to cancel each other out. Seats are arranged in categories of safeness following to the Australian Electoral Commission's classification of safeness. "Safe" seats require a swing of over 10 per cent to change, "fairly safe" seats require a swing of between 6 and 10 per cent, while "marginal" seats require a swing of less than 6 per cent.

Queensland Liberal and National MPs contested the 2010 federal election as members of the Queensland Liberal National Party. They retained their original party affiliation until after the election.

Notes

References

Pendulums for Australian federal elections